Reed is an unincorporated community within Henderson County, Kentucky, United States.

References

Unincorporated communities in Henderson County, Kentucky
Unincorporated communities in Kentucky